Alsino and the Condor is a 1982 Nicaraguan film directed by Chilean filmmaker Miguel Littín. It was nominated for the Academy Award for Best Foreign Language Film. It  won the Golden Prize at the 13th Moscow International Film Festival. The film was a co-production between Nicaragua, Mexico and Cuba. The film is loosely based on the novel Alsino by Chilean writer Pedro Prado, and is set during the Nicaraguan Revolution. It starred Dean Stockwell.

Cast
 Dean Stockwell as Frank
 Alan Esquivel as  Alsino
 Carmen Bunster as Alsino's Grandmother
 Alejandro Parodi as The Major
 Delia Casanova as Rosaria
 Marta Lorena Pérez as Lucia
 Reynaldo Miravalles as Don Nazario, the Birdman
 Marcelo Gaete as Lucia's Grandfather
 Jan Kees De Roy as Dutch Adviser

Awards

Wins
 Moscow International Film Festival - Golden Prize, Miguel Littin, 1983.

Nominations
  Academy Awards - Best Foreign Language Film, 1983.

See also
 List of submissions to the 55th Academy Awards for Best Foreign Language Film
 List of Nicaraguan submissions for the Academy Award for Best Foreign Language Film

References

External links
 

1982 films
1982 drama films
Films directed by Miguel Littín
Films about Latin American military dictatorships
Nicaraguan Revolution
Nicaraguan films
1980s Spanish-language films